The statue of Augustine of Hippo, or the statue of Saint Augustinus, is an outdoor sculpture by Jeroným Kohl, installed on the north side of the Charles Bridge in Prague, Czech Republic.

External links

 

Cultural depictions of Augustine of Hippo
Christian sculptures
Monuments and memorials in Prague
Sculptures of men in Prague
Statues of writers
Statues on the Charles Bridge